"Happy Pledis 1st Album" is a charity single by the South Korean girl group After School. The album was released under the name "Happy Pledis" and is a charity release. The album didn't include rapper Bekah, as she was on holiday during promotions. Songs "Love Love Love" and "Someone is You" were both promotional singles from the album. The title track, "Love Love Love", was written by After School's main vocalist, Raina.

History
The “Happy PLEDIS” album is a project album purported to give back the love and support the artists have received from their fans; it also asks people to look around themselves with a warmer heart in the winter season. Pledis Entertainment's artists Son Dambi, After School, and their sub-unit group Orange Caramel each released their own version of the “Happy PLEDIS” album. “Fans will be able to see a lovelier side of After School through this album, along with a sweet melody that will make this winter season that much more beautiful.” Pledis also spoke about Bekah's absence from the album; “Bekah was unable to participate in this album because she is on break at her home in Hawaii. She’s been working for the past 3-4 years and was unable to go home, which is why we let her go this time. She will be in Hawaii for the next one or two months.”
A portion of the profits from the “Happy PLEDIS” albums was donated to the “Save the Children” organization.

The girls first performed "Someone Is You", before performing "Love Love Love" later.

Track listing

Chart performance

Album chart

Single chart
Love Love Love

References

External links
 Official website

2010 albums
After School (band) albums
Charity singles
Single albums
Hybe Corporation albums